The Bemarivo River, literally the big shallow, is located in northern Madagascar. It drains to the north-eastern coast, into the Indian Ocean. It drains the eastern part of the Tsaratanana Massif and the northern half of the Marojejy Massif.

It is crossed by the RN 5a near Nosiarina. Its mouth is situated 17 km north of Sambava.

It serves as the northern edge of the territory known as Betsimisaraka. Confusingly, a tributary of the Sofia River is also called the Bemarivo River (Sofia).

References 

Rivers of Madagascar
Rivers of Sava Region